Mother Earth Brewing is a craft beer brewery located in Kinston, North Carolina.  The brewery was founded in late 2008 by owners Stephen Hill and Trent Mooring and began production in 2009.

Beers
Mother Earth currently produces five core beers: an India Pale Ale called Long Weekend, a Kolsch-style ale called Endless River, a Belgian Wit beer called Weeping Willow Wit, a Hazy IPA called Alpenglow, and a Premium Lager called Vanishing Tides. 

In addition to these beers, Mother Earth has a seasonal large format beer released each year: Silent Night, an Imperial Stout brewed with coffee from Raleigh boutique coffee roaster Counter Culture Coffee and also aged in bourbon barrels.

Labels
All of Mother Earth's labels are beautiful, artistic scenes of Mother Nature herself, each featuring a human element interacting with their environment in a positive way.

Environmental Responsibility
Mission Statement: Mother Earth provides a better world through quality craftsmanship, civic responsibility, and environmental stewardship.

The brewery focuses on being as environmentally friendly as possible.  A 4.5 kilowatt solar array stands on the roof and powers Mother Earth's Tap Room.  Blue jean insulation, a 100% recyclable product, was used to insulate the walls. In addition to being a recyclable product, it also has outstanding sound barrier qualities. Soy-based spray foam insulation protects the second story ceiling. Low volatile organic compounds (VOCs) paint covers the walls. Mother Earth Brewing's corporate offices sport eco carpet partially made from renewable resources. Eco flush valves reduce water needed for flushing by 30%. Eco faucets in the bathrooms offer an unimaginable savings in water compared to conventional faucets. Tankless water heater heats water on demand, instead of using needless energy to keep hundreds of gallons of water heated at all times.  Mother Earth Brewing employs green brewing procedures as well. One example grabbed the interest of local farmers. Rather than send spent grain used in the brewing process off to the landfill, it is given to local farmers as top quality feed for their animals-a win-win for all involved. Mother Earth also has planted 25 hop rhizomes penetrating the soil in Kinston.

As of February 12, 2013, Mother Earth Brewing became the first brewery to attain LEED® Gold Certification.

See also
 Barrel-aged beer

References

External links
 Mother Earth Brewing official website

Beer brewing companies based in North Carolina
Food and drink companies established in 2009
Lenoir County, North Carolina